Roger Lawrence "Rod" Strunk (March 20, 1941 – July 11, 2007), popularly known as Rod Lauren, was an American actor and singer.

As an actor, he worked mostly in television, appearing in single episodes of Alfred Hitchcock Presents, Combat! and Gomer Pyle, U.S.M.C. amongst others during the 1960s. Lauren's most notable film is The Crawling Hand (1963) which achieved latter-day notoriety when it was featured on Mystery Science Theater 3000.

As a singer, Lauren is a one-hit wonder who hit #31 on the Billboard Hot 100 chart with the song "If I Had a Girl" in 1960 and performed twice on The Ed Sullivan Show that year.

From 1979 to 2001, Lauren, who had since reverted to the use of his given name, Roger Lawrence Strunk, was married to Nida Blanca, a leading Filipino film actress whom Lauren met during the filming of Once Before I Die. After Blanca's body was discovered on November 7, 2001 in the parking lot inside a San Juan City parking garage (she had been stabbed to death), Lauren soon emerged as a suspect behind the killing.

He moved back to the United States and was able to successfully fight extradition to the Philippines to face trial for the murder. Other suspects were later charged.

On July 11, 2007, Lauren committed suicide by jumping from a second-floor balcony of the Tracy Inn in Tracy, California, where he had been staying for the previous three days.

References

External links 

1941 births
2007 deaths
American male film actors
American male television actors
RCA Victor artists
Musicians from Fresno, California
Suicides by jumping in California
People from Tracy, California
Male actors from Fresno, California
20th-century American singers
20th-century American male actors
20th-century American male singers
2007 suicides